Vince Morales (born November 12, 1990) is an American mixed martial artist who competed in the Featherweight division most recently for the Ultimate Fighting Championship (UFC). A professional mixed martial artist since 2015, Morales has also competed in Bellator.

Background
Morales grew up in Ontario, Oregon and started wrestling while attending Ontario High School. Despite going winless in wrestling in his freshman year and halfway of the sophomore year, he ended becoming a state champion in his senior year. Morales attended Boise State University for a spell, but dropped out due to family issues.

Mixed martial arts career

Early career
Morales made his MMA debut at featherweight against Joseph Cleveland on May 15, 2015 at FSF - Front Street Fights 5. He won the fight via submission with a rear-naked choke in the first round.

Following his MMA debut, Morales mainly fought within the Idaho regional MMA circuit, competing within organisations such as King of the Cage and Front Street Fights, wherein he held the organisation's featherweight title.

Bellator MMA
Morales made his Bellator debut at featherweight on May 20, 2016 against Hamilton Ash at Bellator 155. He won the fight via knockout with punches in the third round.

Morales faced Justin Hugo at bantamweight on September 21, 2018 at Bellator 205. He won the fight via unanimous decision.

Dana White's Contender Series
Morales faced Domingo Pilarte on July 17, 2018 at Dana White's Contender Series 13. He lost the fight via technical submission via rear-naked choke.

Ultimate Fighting Championship
Replacing injured Frankie Saenz on short notice, Morales made his UFC debut at bantamweight on November 24, 2018 against Song Yadong at UFC Fight Night: Blaydes vs. Ngannou 2. He lost the fight via unanimous decision.

Morales then faced Aiemann Zahabi on May 4, 2019 at UFC Fight Night: Iaquinta vs. Cowboy. He won the fight via unanimous decision.

Morales next faced Benito Lopez on July 13, 2019 at UFC Fight Night: de Randamie vs. Ladd. He lost the fight via unanimous decision.

Morales then returned to featherweight and faced Chris Gutiérrez on May 30, 2020 at UFC on ESPN: Woodley vs. Burns. He lost the fight via TKO with leg kicks in the second round. Three months after his loss to Gutiérrez, he suffered a torn Achilles tendon which required two surgeries.

Morales returned to bantamweight and face Drako Rodriguez at UFC 265 on August 7, 2021. He won the fight via unanimous decision.

Morales faced Louis Smolka on December 4, 2021 at UFC on ESPN 31. He won the fight via knockout out in round one.

Morales, as a replacement for Liudvik Sholinian, was scheduled to face Nathaniel Wood on March 19, 2022 at UFC Fight Night: Volkov vs. Aspinall. In turn, just days before the event, Morales withdrew due to illness, and the pair will be rescheduled for future event.

Morales faced Jonathan Martinez on May 21, 2022 at UFC Fight Night 206. He lost the fight via unanimous decision.

Morales was scheduled to face José Johnson on November 19, 2022, at UFC Fight Night 215, but Johnson pulled out for undisclosed reasons, and he was replaced by Miles Johns on November 19, 2022, at UFC Fight Night 215. Morales lost the fight via unanimous decision.

It was annonced in mid January that Morales was released by UFC.

Personal life
Morales is the cousin of fellow UFC bantamweight fighter Ricky Simón.

Championships and accomplishments

Front Street Fights
 FSF Featherweight Championship (One time)

Mixed martial arts record

|-
|Loss
|align=center|11–7
|Miles Johns
|Decision (unanimous)
|UFC Fight Night: Nzechukwu vs. Cuțelaba
|
|align=center|3
|align=center|5:00
||Las Vegas, Nevada, United States
|
|-
|Loss
|align=center|11–6
|Jonathan Martinez
|Decision (unanimous)
|UFC Fight Night: Holm vs. Vieira
|
|align=center|3
|align=center|5:00
|Las Vegas, Nevada, United States
|
|-
|Win
|align=center|11–5
|Louis Smolka
|KO (punches)
|UFC on ESPN: Font vs. Aldo
|
|align=center|1
|align=center|2:02
|Las Vegas, Nevada, United States
|
|-
|Win
|align=center|10–5
|Drako Rodriguez
|Decision (unanimous)
|UFC 265
|
|align=center|3
|align=center|5:00
|Houston, Texas, United States
|
|-
|Loss
|align=center|9–5
|Chris Gutiérrez
|TKO (leg kicks)
|UFC on ESPN: Woodley vs. Burns
|
|align=center|2
|align=center|4:27
|Las Vegas, Nevada, United States
|
|-
|Loss
|align=center|9–4
|Benito Lopez
|Decision (unanimous)
|UFC Fight Night: de Randamie vs. Ladd
|
|align=center|3
|align=center|5:00
|Sacramento, California, United States
|
|-
|Win
|align=center|9–3
|Aiemann Zahabi
|Decision (unanimous)
|UFC Fight Night: Iaquinta vs. Cowboy
|
|align=center|3
|align=center|5:00
|Ottawa, Ontario, Canada
|
|-
|Loss
|align=center|8–3
|Song Yadong
|Decision (unanimous)
|UFC Fight Night: Blaydes vs. Ngannou 2
|
|align=center|3
|align=center|5:00
|Beijing, China
|
|-
|Win
|align=center|8–2
|Justin Hugo
|Decision (unanimous)
|Bellator 205
|
|align=center|3
|align=center|5:00
|Boise, Idaho, United States
|
|-
|Loss
|align=center|7–2
|Domingo Pilarte
|Technical Submission (rear-naked choke)
|Dana White's Contender Series 13
|
|align=center|2
|align=center|1:52
|Las Vegas, Nevada, United States
|
|-
|Win
|align=center|7–1
|Brandon Hempleman
|TKO (punches)
|Front Street Fights 15
|
|align=center|2
|align=center|2:38
|Boise, Idaho, United States
|
|-
|Win
|align=center|6–1
|Rowdy Akers
|Submission (arm-triangle choke)
|KOTC: Quick Draw
|
|align=center|1
|align=center|1:58
|Fort Hall, Idaho, United States
|
|-
|Win
|align=center|5–1
|Andrew Cruz
|KO (punches)
|Front Street Fights 10
|
|align=center|3
|align=center|3:07
|Boise, Idaho, United States
|
|-
|Win
|align=center|4–1
|Hamilton Ash
|KO (punches)
|Bellator 155
|
|align=center|3
|align=center|2:32
|Boise, Idaho, United States
|
|-
|Win
|align=center|3–1
|Patrick Trey Smith
|TKO (punches)
|Front Street Fights 8
|
|align=center|1
|align=center|4:15
|Boise, Idaho, United States
|
|-
|Loss
|align=center|2–1
|Josh Wick
|Submission (armbar)
|Front Street Fights 6
|
|align=center|2
|align=center|3:26
|Boise, Idaho, United States
|
|-
|Win
|align=center|2–0
|Jeremie Montgomery
|TKO (punches)
|SFL 41: America 5
|
|align=center|1
|align=center|2:28
|Tacoma, Washington, United States
|
|-
|Win
|align=center|1–0
|Joseph Cleveland
|Submission (rear-naked choke)
|Front Street Fights 5
|
|align=center|1
|align=center|1:51
|Boise, Idaho, United States
|
|-

See also 

 List of male mixed martial artists

References

External links 

 
 

1990 births
Living people
Featherweight mixed martial artists
Mixed martial artists utilizing wrestling
Mixed martial artists utilizing Brazilian jiu-jitsu
American male mixed martial artists
Mixed martial artists from Idaho
Ultimate Fighting Championship male fighters
American male sport wrestlers
Amateur wrestlers
American practitioners of Brazilian jiu-jitsu
American sportspeople of Mexican descent